Harpagophoridae is a family of round-backed millipedes of the order Spirostreptida. The family includes 269 species belonging to 55 genera,  distributed in Africa,  Southeast Asia, and the East Indies, as well as a few Indian Oceanic islands. Two subfamilies are recognized.

Genera
There are about 55 genera (and 269 species):
 
Agaricogonopus 
Alienostreptus 
Anurostreptus 
Apoctenophora 
Armatostreptus 
Balustreptus 
Cambodjostreptus 
Carlogonus 
Cercostreptus 
Cornugonus 
Ctenorangoon 
Cystogonopus 
Dametus 
Drepanopus 
Duplopisthus 
Eremobelus 
Fageostreptus 
Falcigonopus 
Gnomognathus 
Gongylorrhus 
Gonoplectus 
Harpagophora 
Harpagophorella 
Harpurostreptus 
Heptischius 
Humbertostreptus 
Indiothauma 
Janardananeptus 
Junceustreptus 
Karschopisthus 
Ktenostreptus 
Lamellostreptus 
Leiotelus 
Leptostreptus 
Organognathus 
Philoporatia 
Phyllogonostreptus 
Picrogonopus 
Poratophilus 
Prominulostreptus 
Remulopygus 
Rhynchoproctus 
Sculptulistreptus 
Spissustreptus 
Spoliatogonus 
Stenurostreptus 
Thaiogonus 
Thyroglutus 
Thyropisthus 
Thyropygus 
Trigonostreptus 
Tuberogonus 
Uriunceustreptus 
Winklerostreptus 
Zinophora

References

Spirobolida
Millipede families